Gary White may refer to:

Gary White (athlete) (born 1985), English athlete
Gary White (baseball) (born 1967), Australian baseball player
Gary White (engineer), 2011 Time 100 selection
Gary White (footballer) (born 1974), English football coach and former player
Gary D. White, American football coach

See also
Gareth White (born 1979), English cricketer
Garry White (disambiguation)